STS-52 was a Space Transportation System (NASA Space Shuttle) mission using Space Shuttle Columbia, and was launched on October 22, 1992.

Crew

Backup crew

Mission highlights 

Primary mission objectives were deployment of the Laser Geodynamics Satellite 2 (LAGEOS-2) and operation of the U.S. Microgravity Payload-1 (USMP-1). LAGEOS 2, a joint effort between NASA and the Italian Space Agency (ASI), was deployed on day 2 and boosted into an initial elliptical orbit by ASI's Italian Research Interim Stage (IRIS). The USMP-1, activated on day one, included three experiments mounted on two connected Mission Peculiar Equipment Support Structures (MPESS) mounted in the orbiter's cargo bay. USMP-1 experiments were: Lambda Point Experiment; Matériel pour l'Étude des Phénomènes Intéressant la Solidification sur eT en Orbite (MEPHISTO), sponsored by the French agency Centre National d'Études Spatiales (CNES); and Space Acceleration Measurement System (SAMS).

Secondary payloads: (1) Canadian experiment (CANEX-2), located in both the orbiter's cargo bay and middeck and which consisted of Space Vision System (SVS); Materials Exposure in Low-Earth Orbit (MELEO); Queen's University Experiment in Liquid-Metal Diffusion (QUELD); Phase Partitioning in Liquids (PARLIQ); Sun Photospectrometre Earth Atmosphere Measurement-2 (SPEAM-2); Orbiter Glow-2 (OGLOW-2); and Space Adaptation Tests and Observations (SATO). A small, specially marked satellite, the Canadian Target Assembly (CTA), was deployed on day nine, to support SVS experiments. (2) ASP, featuring three independent sensors mounted on a Hitchhiker plate in the cargo bay - Modular Star Sensor (MOSS), Yaw Earth Sensor (YES) and Low Altitude Conical Earth Sensor (LACES), all provided by the European Space Agency (ESA).

Other middeck payloads: Commercial Materials Dispersion Apparatus Instrument Technology Associates Experiments; Commercial Protein Crystal Growth experiment; Chemical Vapor Transport Experiment Heat Pipe Performance Experiment (CVTEHPPE); Physiological Systems Experiment (PSE) (involving 12 rodents); and Shuttle Plume Impingement Experiment (SPIE). The orbiter also was used as a reference point for calibrating an Ultraviolet Plume Instrument on an orbiting Strategic Defense Initiative Organization (SDIO) satellite.

The Tank Pressure Control Experiment/Thermal Phenomena (TPCE/TP) was contained in a Getaway Special (GAS) canister in the orbiter's cargo bay.

Some of the ashes of Star Trek creator Gene Roddenberry were also carried aboard the orbiter for the duration of the mission.

Wake-up calls 
NASA began a tradition of playing music to astronauts during the Project Gemini, and first used music to wake up a flight crew during Apollo 15. A special musical track is chosen for each day in space, often by the astronauts' families, to have a special meaning to an individual member of the crew, or in reference to the day's planned activities.

See also 

 List of human spaceflights
 List of Space Shuttle missions
 Outline of space science
 Space Shuttle

References

External links 
 NASA mission summary 
 STS-52 Video Highlights 

Space Shuttle missions
Spacecraft launched in 1992